The National Basketball League Defensive Player of the Year is an annual National Basketball League (NBL) award given since the 2019 New Zealand NBL season to the best defensive player of the regular season.

Winners 

|}

See also
 List of National Basketball League (New Zealand) awards

References

Awards established in 2019
D